Churchbridge is a hamlet in Cornwall, England. It is a mile west of Duloe, and is situated on the West Looe River. Both banks of the river are wooded, and to the north of the bridge is a disused quarry and Tremadart Mills, marked as a corn mill on the 1882 map.

References

Hamlets in Cornwall